Don Franklin (born December 14, 1960) is an American actor, best known for his roles in seaQuest DSV as Commander Jonathan Ford, Seven Days as Captain Craig Donovan, and as one of The Young Riders (Noah Dixon).

Biography
Franklin was born and raised in Chicago and graduated from Whitney M. Young Magnet High School.
He has a daughter with his first wife Sheila, and a son with his second wife, Kristine, from whom he is now divorced.
Franklin currently lives and works in Los Angeles, CA.

Partial filmography

Northville Cemetery Massacre (1976) - Officer Fedorko
Somewhere in Time (1980) - Tourist in Hall of History #2
Fast Forward (1985) - Michael Stafford
The Cosby Show (1987, TV Series) - Greg Martinson
Moving (1988) - Kevin
Knightwatch (1988–1989, TV Series) - Calvin Garvey
The Big Picture (1989) - Todd Marvin
Nasty Boys (TV series) (1989, TV Movie) - Alex Wheeler
The Young Riders (1990–1992, TV Series) - Noah Dixon
seaQuest DSV (1993–1996, TV Series) - Commander Jonathan Ford
Asteroid (1997, TV Movie) - Ben Dodd
Living Single (1997, TV Series) - Dexter Knight
Moesha (1998, TV Series) - Shelby
Seven Days (1998–2001, TV Series) - Captain Craig Donovan
Girlfriends (2001–2002, TV Series) - Stan
The District (2001–2003, TV Series) - AJ
Anna's Dream (2002, TV Movie) - Tommy Thompson
Between the Sheets (2003) - Reporter #1
Hair Show (2004) - Basil
CSI: Miami (2005, TV Series) - Bart Jameson
Black Dawn (2005, Video) - Max Pierson
NCIS (2005–2006, TV Series) - FBI Agent Ron Sacks
Day Break (2006–2007, TV Series) - Randall Mathis 
Journeyman (2007, TV Series) - Ed Macklin
Chrissa Stands Strong (2009, Video) - Mr. Beck
The Shift (2009, Video) - Rob (The Cinematographer)
The Closer (2009, TV Series) - Kelvin Blake
The Space Between (2010) - Paul Ehrlich
How to Make Love to a Woman (2010) - Clive (uncredited)
Any Day Now (2012) - Lonnie Washington

External links
 

1960 births
Living people
African-American male actors
Male actors from Chicago
American male film actors
American male television actors
21st-century African-American people
20th-century African-American people